Biscuit Bitch is a small chain of restaurants in the Seattle metropolitan area, in the U.S. state of Washington. The business operates in Belltown and at Pike Place Market. Previously, Biscuit Bitch had locations in Pioneer Square and White Center, which closed in 2020 during the COVID-19 pandemic.

Description 
Seattle Metropolitan has said of the Cajun/Creole/Southern restaurant: "Equipped with cheddar-topped hangover cures, this self-described 'trailer park to table' cafe serves up gravy-drenched biscuits with southern-inspired fixings: garlic grits, hot links, pork sausage, and more."

History 
The business is owned by Kimmie Spice. The White Center location opened in 2019. Lizzo visited the First Avenue location in 2019.

Reception 
Allecia Vermillion included the business in Seattle Metropolitan's 2022 list of "the best biscuits in Seattle".

See also 

 List of Cajun restaurants
 List of restaurant chains in the United States
 List of Southern restaurants

References

External links 

 

Belltown, Seattle
Cajun restaurants in the United States
Central Waterfront, Seattle
Pike Place Market
Pioneer Square, Seattle
Restaurant chains in the United States
Restaurants in Seattle
Southern restaurants